Akunk is a village in the Vardenis Municipality of the Gegharkunik Province of Armenia.

History 
The village was founded on the site of a Bronze Age settlement and to the west of Akunk, there is a cyclopean fort, Klor Dar, dating from between the 6th and 4th centuries BC. There are two Tukh Manuk pilgrimage sites in the village as well.

Gallery

References

External links 
 
 

Populated places in Gegharkunik Province